The 1973 1000 Lakes Rally (formally the 23rd 1000 Lakes Rally) was the 23rd running of the 1000 Lakes Rally (currently known as the Rally Finland), and the eighth round of the inaugural World Rally Championship season.

Report 
Run in early August in central Finland, this rally marked a distinct change from the previous event in the series, the 33 Rajd Polski.  Unlike that event, in which only three teams survived to the finish, Finland saw 55 teams finish the rally, a success rate of almost exactly 50% of the total entries.

In 1973, and for several years afterward, only manufacturers were given points for finishes in WRC events.  Finland hosted Ford Motor Company's first ever win of the World Rally Championship. Championship front runners Alpine Renault and Fiat were conspicuous by their absence, with neither gaining points during the round.

Results 

Source: Independent WRC archive

Championship standings after the event

References

External links 
 Official website of the World Rally Championship
 1973 1000 Lakes Rally at Rallye-info 

1000 Lakes
Rally Finland
1000 Lakes Rally, 1973